Walter Kohl Sudduth (born August 8, 1974) is an American actor. He is best known for his role as Luther "Suitcase" Simpson in nine Jesse Stone television films.

Early life and education
Walter Kohl Sudduth was born August 8, 1974 in Granada Hills, Los Angeles, the younger brother of actor Skipp Sudduth. He was raised in the small town of Circleville, Ohio. Sudduth acted in several high school plays, including Cheaper by the Dozen and Flowers for Algernon, before attending Ohio University, where he focused his energies on music. During his college years, Sudduth was the guitarist and vocalist of Edison, a punk rock band that played throughout the American Midwest. He graduated in 1995 with a BA in English.

Career
In 1995, Sudduth moved to New York City to pursue a professional acting career. He appeared regularly at improv comedy clubs and theaters such as the Red Room to hone his comedy skills. Sudduth made his film debut in director John Turturro's Illuminata (1997) playing Christopher Walken's concubine. The following year he appeared in two films, 54 (1998) as Rhett and Rounders (1998) as Wagner with Edward Norton and Matt Damon.

Sudduth's breakthrough role came in 1999 with Bowfinger (1999) playing Slater, an aspiring actor, opposite Eddie Murphy, Steve Martin and Heather Graham. The role increased Sudduth's appeal and widened his audience with his capable and charming portrayal of a slacker actor. In 2000, Sudduth appeared in two films, the teen comedy Road Trip (2000) as Mark and the Masterpiece Theater production Cora Unashamed (2000), based on the Langston Hughes short story, as Joe.

Throughout this period, Sudduth also appeared in several television series, including one episode of All My Children (1997) as Rick the waiter, one episode of Sex and the City (1998) as Kim Cattrall's love interest Jon, one episode of Law & Order: Special Victims Unit (1999) as Riley Couger and 17 episodes of Grosse Pointe (2000–2001) as Quentin King and Stone Anders.

Sudduth is best known for his role as Luther "Suitcase" Simpson co-starring opposite Tom Selleck in nine Jesse Stone television films (2005–2015). He plays bass in his brother Skipp's rock band Minus Ted. He enjoys rock climbing and playing basketball while dividing his time between New York City and Los Angeles, California.

Filmography
 All My Children (1997), Rick
 Dating Games (1998), Prince Charming
 Illuminata (1998), Concubine #1
 Sex and the City (1998, TV series), Jon, 1 episode
 54 (1998), Rhett
 Rounders (1998), Wagner
 Bowfinger (1999), Slater
 Law & Order: Special Victims Unit (1999, TV series), Riley Couger, 1 episode
 Table One (2000), Freddie
 Road Trip (2000), Mark
 Cora Unashamed (2000, TV movie), Joe
 Grosse Pointe (2000–2001, TV series), Quentin King / Stone Anders, 17 episodes
 The Banger Sisters (2002), Hotel Clerk
 Stone Cold (2005, TV movie), Luther "Suitcase" Simpson
 The Notorious Bettie Page (2005), Police Officer
 Jesse Stone: Night Passage (2006, TV movie), Luther "Suitcase" Simpson
 Jesse Stone: Death in Paradise (2006, TV movie), Luther "Suitcase" Simpson
 Law & Order: Criminal Intent (TV series, 2006), Zach, 1 episode
 Jesse Stone: Sea Change (2007, TV movie), Luther "Suitcase" Simpson
 Jesse Stone: Thin Ice (2009, TV movie), Luther "Suitcase" Simpson
 Jesse Stone: No Remorse (2010, TV movie), Luther "Suitcase" Simpson
 Jesse Stone: Innocents Lost (2011, TV movie), Luther "Suitcase" Simpson
 Jesse Stone: Benefit of the Doubt (2012, TV movie), Luther "Suitcase" Simpson
 Blue Bloods (2015, TV series), Sam Holbrooke, 1 episode 
 Jesse Stone: Lost in Paradise (2015, TV movie), officer Luther "Suitcase" Simpson

References

External links
 
 
 

1974 births
Living people
Male actors from Ohio
American male film actors
American male television actors
Male actors from Los Angeles
Ohio University alumni
People from Circleville, Ohio
People from Granada Hills, Los Angeles